Ridgeland Airport  is a county-owned public-use airport in Jasper County, South Carolina, United States.  The airport is located one nautical mile (2 km) northwest of downtown Ridgeland. It is also known as Jasper County Airport as it serves the entirety of Jasper County.  The airport began operations in 1943 as a private airfield for aviation enthusiasts and received state funding in 1960 to construct a paved runway.  Several flight instruction schools and clubs utilize the facility on a regular basis.

Facilities and aircraft 
It has one runway designated 3/21 with an asphalt surface measuring 2,692 by 70 feet (821 x 21 m).

References

External links 
 Ridgeland Airport website
 Ridgeland Airport profile from S.C. Aeronautics Commission
 

Airports in South Carolina
Buildings and structures in Jasper County, South Carolina
Transportation in Jasper County, South Carolina
1943 establishments in South Carolina
Airports established in 1943